Paweł Aleksander Pawlikowski (born 15 September 1957) is a Polish filmmaker. He garnered early praise for a string of documentaries in the 1990s and for his award-winning feature films of the 2000s, Last Resort (2000) and My Summer of Love (2004). His success continued into the 2010s with Ida (2013), which won the Academy Award for Best Foreign Language Film, and Cold War (2018), for which Pawlikowski won the Best Director prize at the Cannes Film Festival and was nominated for the Academy Award for Best Director, while the film received a nomination for Best Foreign Language Film.

Early life
Pawlikowski was born in Warsaw, Poland, to a father who was a doctor and a mother who started as a ballet dancer and later became an English literature professor at the University of Warsaw. In his late teens, he learned that his paternal grandmother was Jewish and had been murdered in Auschwitz.
At the age of 14, he left communist Poland with his mother for London. What he thought was a holiday turned out to be a permanent exile. A year later he moved to Germany, before finally settling in Britain in 1977. He studied literature and philosophy at Oxford University.

Career
In the late 1980s and 1990s, Pawlikowski was best known for his documentaries, whose blend of lyricism and irony won him many fans and awards around the world. From Moscow to Pietushki was a poetic journey into the world of the Russian cult writer Venedikt Erofeev, for which he won an Emmy, an RTS award, a Prix Italia and other awards. The multi-award-winning Dostoevsky's Travels was a tragi-comic road movie in which a St Petersburg tram driver and the only living descendant of Fyodor Dostoevsky, travels rough around Western Europe haunting high-minded humanists, aristocrats, monarchists and the Baden-Baden casino in his quest to raise money to buy a secondhand Mercedes.

Pawlikowski's most original and formally successful film was Serbian Epics (1992), made at the height of the Bosnian War. The oblique, ironic, imagistic, at times almost hypnotic study of epic Serbian poetry, with exclusive footage of Radovan Karadžić and General Ratko Mladić, aroused a storm of controversy and incomprehension at the time, but has now secured it something of a cult status. The absurdist Tripping with Zhirinovsky, a surreal boat journey down the Volga with controversial Russian politician Vladimir Zhirinovsky, won Pawlikowski the Grierson Award for the Best British Documentary in 1995.
 
Pawlikowski's transition to fiction occurred in 1998 with a small 50-minute hybrid film Twockers, a lyrical and gritty love story set on a sink estate in Yorkshire, which he co-wrote and co-directed with Ian Duncan. In 2001 he wrote and directed Last Resort starring Dina Korzun and Paddy Considine, which won a BAFTA, the Michael Powell Award for Best British Film at Edinburgh and many other awards. In 2004 he wrote and directed My Summer of Love starring Emily Blunt and Natalie Press, which won a BAFTA, the Michael Powell Award for Best British Film and many other awards.

In 2006, he filmed about 60% of his adaptation of Magnus Mills' The Restraint of Beasts when the project was halted—his wife had fallen gravely ill and he left to care for her and their children. In 2011, he wrote and directed a film loosely adapted from Douglas Kennedy's novel The Woman in the Fifth, starring Ethan Hawke and Kristin Scott Thomas.

On 19 October 2013, his film Ida (starring Agata Kulesza) won the Best Film Award at the London Film Festival, on the same night that Anthony Chen, one of his students at the National Film and Television School, won the Sutherland Prize for the Best First Film, for Ilo Ilo. Ida won the 2015 Academy Award for Foreign Language Film on 23 February 2015, the first Polish film to do so. In the same year, he was a member of the jury headed by Alfonso Cuarón at the 72nd Venice International Film Festival.

In 2017, Pawlikowski adapted Emmanuel Carrère's biographical novel Limonov (2011), based on the life of Eduard Limonov, into a screenplay. Pawlikowski planned to direct the film adaptation but revealed in 2020 that he lost interest in the character and abandoned plans to direct.

His most recent film, Cold War earned him the Best Director Award at the 2018 Cannes Film Festival. It also won five awards at the 2018 European Film Awards including Best Film, Best Director and Best Actress Awards. In 2019, he was announced as one of the members of the jury at the Cannes Film Festival.

Pawlikowski's next film is scheduled to begin filming in 2023 under the working title The Island. The film is inspired by true events and will star Joaquin Phoenix and Rooney Mara as an American couple in the 1930s, who leave behind civilization to live on a deserted island.

Personal life
Pawlikowski grew up a Catholic and considers himself one up to this day, but says that he finds the Catholic Church in Great Britain to be easier to grow in faith in than that in Poland.

Pawlikowski was a Creative Arts Fellow at Oxford Brookes University from 2004 to 2007. He teaches film direction and screenwriting at the National Film School in the UK and the Wajda Film School in Warsaw. In addition to his native Polish, he speaks six languages including German and Russian. 

Pawlikowski's first wife, who was Russian, developed a serious illness in 2006 and died several months later. They have a son and a daughter. After his children left for university, Pawlikowski moved to Paris, and later relocated to Warsaw, where he lives close to his childhood home. At the end of 2017, he married Polish model and actress Małgosia Bela.

Filmography

Awards and nominations

Academy Awards

British Academy Film Awards

Golden Globe Awards

European Film Awards

Polish Film Awards

British Independent Film Awards

Film festivals and other award ceremonies

Critics' Circle

Other distinctions

Pawlikowski was made Honorary Associate of London Film School. In 2019, he was awarded the title of an honorary citizen of Warsaw.

See also 
 Cinema of Poland
 List of Poles
 List of Polish Academy Award winners and nominees

References

External links
 
 BBC Interview 2004
 Pawel Pawlikowski's website
 Paweł Pawlikowski at Culture.pl
 Interview with Terry Gross on NPR's Fresh Air, 12 February 2015
 Paweł Pawlikowski and his TV movie documentaries From Moscow to Pietushki, Dostoevsky’s Travels, Serbian Epics and Tripping with Zhirinovski on vimeo

1957 births
Living people
Film people from Warsaw
Polish film directors
Polish television directors
Academics of Oxford Brookes University
British film directors
British television directors
Polish emigrants to the United Kingdom
Polish people of Jewish descent
Polish Roman Catholics
Cannes Film Festival Award for Best Director winners
Directors of Best Foreign Language Film Academy Award winners
European Film Award for Best Director winners
European Film Award for Best Screenwriter winners
Filmmakers who won the Best Foreign Language Film BAFTA Award
Outstanding Debut by a British Writer, Director or Producer BAFTA Award winners